Acanthocephalini is a tribe of leaf-footed bugs in the family Coreidae. There are at least 100 described species in Acanthocephalini found in the Americas.

Genera
These 15 genera belong to the tribe Acanthocephalini:

 Acanthocephala Laporte, 1833 i c g b
 Cervantistellus Brailovsky and Barrera, 2005 i c g
 Cleotopetalops Brailovsky, 2000 i c g
 Ctenomelynthus Breddin, 1903 i c g
 Empedocles Stål, 1867 i c g
 Ichilocoris Brailovsky and Barrera, 2001 i c g
 Laminiceps Costa, 1863 i c g
 Leptopetalops Breddin, 1901 i c g
 Lucullia Stål, 1865 i c g
 Meluchopetalops Breddin, 1903 i c g
 Petalops Amyot and Serville, 1843 i c g
 Placophyllopus Blöte, 1938 i c g
 Salapia Stål, 1865 i c g
 Stenometapodus Breddin, 1903 i c g
 Thymetus Stål, 1867 i c g

Data sources: i = ITIS, c = Catalogue of Life, g = GBIF, b = Bugguide.net

References

Further reading

External links

 

 
Coreinae
Hemiptera tribes